Thalassobacillus hwangdonensis is a Gram-positive, endospore-forming, rod-shaped and motile bacterium from the genus of Thalassobacillus which has been isolated from tidal flat from the Yellow Sea in Korea.

References

External links
Type strain of Thalassobacillus hwangdonensis at BacDive -  the Bacterial Diversity Metadatabase

 

Bacillaceae
Bacteria described in 2010